Bhasurari is a village in West Champaran district in the Indian state of Bihar.

Demographics
At the 2011 India census, Bhasurari had a population of 3,158 in 555 households. Males constituted 50.63% of the population and females 49.36%. Bhasurari had an average literacy rate of 42.97%, lower than the national average of 74%: male literacy was 61%, and female literacy was 38%. 17.57% of the population were under 6 years of age.

References

Bhasurari chauk west champaran